Nina R. Schooler (born July 26, 1934) is an American psychologist. She is a professor in the Department of Psychiatry and Behavioral Sciences at SUNY Downstate Medical Center, as well as a founding member of the Brain and Behavior Research Foundation's scientific council. She is known for her research on the treatment of schizophrenia, as well as tardive dyskinesia and first-episode psychosis. She is a past president of the American Psychopathological Association and of the Association for Clinical Psychosocial Research. She previously worked at the National Institute of Mental Health and the University of Pittsburgh. The American Society of Clinical Psychopharmacology established the Nina Schooler Early Career Research Award in her honor.

References

External links
Nina Schooler by Thomas Ban

1934 births
Living people
American women psychiatrists
American psychiatrists
Schizophrenia researchers
Psychopharmacologists
SUNY Downstate Medical Center faculty
City College of New York alumni
Columbia University alumni
University of Pittsburgh faculty
American women academics
21st-century American women